Katherine Ramsland (born January 2, 1953) is an American non-fiction author and professor of forensic psychology. Ramsland writes in the genres of crime, forensic science, and the supernatural. She is also a professor of forensic psychology and criminal justice at DeSales University.

Early life and education 
Ramsland was born in Ann Arbor, Michigan and grew up in the neighboring town of Saline. She is the daughter of Barbara and Henry Johnston, and has three siblings. She earned a bachelor's degree in psychology and philosophy from Northern Arizona University in 1978, a master's in clinical psychology from Duquesne University in 1979, a Ph.D. in philosophy from Rutgers University in 1984, a master's degree in forensic psychology from the John Jay College of Criminal Justice in 2000, a master's in criminal justice from DeSales University in 2012, and a masters of fine art from DeSales University in 2021.

Career 
Ramsland has written on the subjects of serial killers, crime scene investigation, vampires, forensic science, mass murder, sex offenders and ghosts, and was a regular contributor to Crime Library.

Awards 
Ramsland's book Into the Devil's Den, co-authored with Dave Hall and Tym Burkey, was named New Mexico Book of the Year in 2008.

References

External links 
 
 

Living people
American crime writers
1953 births
Rutgers University alumni
Writers from Michigan
21st-century American women writers
American women non-fiction writers
21st-century American non-fiction writers
DeSales University faculty
American non-fiction crime writers
American women bloggers
DeSales University alumni
Duquesne University alumni
John Jay College of Criminal Justice alumni
Northern Arizona University alumni